Robin Seidl (born 21 January 1990) is an Austrian beach volleyball player.

He competed at the 2016 Summer Olympics in Rio de Janeiro, in the men's beach volleyball tournament.

References

External links

1990 births
Living people
Austrian beach volleyball players
Olympic beach volleyball players of Austria
Beach volleyball players at the 2016 Summer Olympics